Tell ad-Daman Subdistrict is a subdistrict of Mount Simeon District in western Aleppo Governorate of northern Syria. It is located to the southeast of the city of Aleppo, in the Jabal al-Hass area.

According to the 2004 census, the subdistrict had a population of 47,501.

References 

Mount Simeon District
Subdistricts of Aleppo Governorate